The Swiss Transportation Safety Investigation Board (STSB, ;) is a government agency of Switzerland.
It investigates civil aviation accidents and incidents and cableway, roadway, waterway, and railway accidents. The head office is in Bern.
The aviation division is based at Payerne Airport in Payerne and the rail/navigation division is based in Bern.

History 

The Swiss Accident Investigation Board was established on 1 November 2011 when the Aircraft Accident Investigation Bureau and the Investigation Bureau for Railway, Funicular and Boat Accidents merged. On 1 February 2015 the name was changed to its current name.

References

External links
 Official website

2011 establishments in Switzerland
Government of Switzerland
Organizations established in 2011
Rail accident investigators
Organizations investigating aviation accidents and incidents